The Aramaic term segan (סגן) or segan hakohanim is a title used in the Talmud to refer to the priest serving as the deputy to the High Priest of Israel.

Hebrew Bible
The form segan is Aramaic (סְגַן), appearing 5 times in the Hebrew Bible in the Aramaic sections of the Book of Daniel to refer to officers of the Babylonian government. The Hebrew form sagan (סָגָן) occurs a further 17 times in Nehemiah and elsewhere, again to refer to officials of the Babylonian rulers.

Talmud
According to the Talmud the deputy was appointed to the position of the segan ha-kohanim with the responsibility of overseeing the actions of the work of the Temple's priests' staff, as well as a stand-in position, ready to take the role of High Priest in case he will be found unfit to serve the holy work on the temple, and thus, the Segan was only second to the High Priest, as Rabbi Hanina Segan ha-Kohanim (40 – 80 CE) attests:

Many times the title commonly appears on the classical texts as ha-Segan ("the Deputy"), instead of the full title of Segan ha-Kohanim', for example on the Mishnah, in an halakha that deals with the work of the High Priest on Yom Kippur:

One can also note the importance given to the matter in the ritual ceremony of "Nichum Aveilim" (consoling the mourners of the deceased), in which the High Priest takes part in:

Two out of three most prominent Segans are noted on the Talmud and on Josephus Flavius' work: Hanina Segan ha-Kohanim, and Eleazar ben Hanania (son of Hananiah b. Hezekiah b. Garon who served as High Priest).

See also
High Priest (Judaism)
Hanina Segan ha-Kohanim
Eleazar ben Hanania

Orthodox rabbinic roles and titles
Hebrew words and phrases in the Hebrew Bible
 
Priesthood (Judaism)
Aramaic words and phrases